Hayes Alan Jenkins (born March 23, 1933) is an American former figure skater. He is the 1956 Olympic champion, a four-time World champion (1953–1956), and a four-time U.S. national champion (1953–1956).

Personal life 
Jenkins was born on March 23, 1933, in Akron, Ohio, the elder brother of David Jenkins, also an American former figure skater. He attended Colorado College and Harvard Law School. He went on to work for the Goodyear tire company as an international lawyer.

In 1961, Jenkins married U.S. figure skater Carol Heiss, who won silver at the 1956 Olympics and gold in 1960. The couple have three children together.

Skating career 
In 1949, Jenkins won his first senior national medal, bronze, and placed 6th in Paris, France, at his first World Championships. The following year, he became the national silver medalist and took bronze at the 1950 World Championships in London, England.

Jenkins placed 5th in the compulsory figures, third in the free skating, and 4th overall at the 1952 Winter Olympics in Oslo, Norway.

In 1953, Jenkins became the national champion for the first time. He went on to win the first of his four consecutive world titles.

Ranked first in the compulsory figures and second in free skating, he won the gold medal as the U.S. swept the men's podium at the 1956 Winter Olympics in Cortina d'Ampezzo, Italy. He retired from competitive skating after winning his fourth world title later in the same year.

The brothers received financial support from the Broadmoor Hotel in Colorado Springs, Colorado, and a foundation.

Competitive highlights

References

External links

1933 births
American male single skaters
Olympic figure skaters of the United States
Figure skaters at the 1952 Winter Olympics
Figure skaters at the 1956 Winter Olympics
Living people
Sportspeople from Akron, Ohio
Olympic gold medalists for the United States in figure skating
World Figure Skating Championships medalists
Medalists at the 1956 Winter Olympics
Harvard Law School alumni
Colorado College alumni
20th-century American people